{{DISPLAYTITLE:C7H14O7}}
The molecular formula C7H14O7 (molar mass: 210.18 g/mol, exact mass: 210.0740 u) may refer to:

 Mannoheptulose
 Sedoheptulose, or D-altro-heptulose

Molecular formulas